James Freeman Burchill (25 October 1897 – 18 December 1940) was an Australian rules footballer who played with Richmond in the Victorian Football League (VFL). He was killed in a motor cycle accident in Canterbury, Melbourne in 1940.

Notes

External links 

1897 births
1940 deaths
Australian rules footballers from Victoria (Australia)
Richmond Football Club players
Australian military personnel of World War I
Road incident deaths in Victoria (Australia)
Motorcycle road incident deaths